Halgerda orstomi is a species of sea slug, a dorid nudibranch, a shell-less marine gastropod mollusk in the family Discodorididae.

Distribution
This species was described from a specimen collected at Vanuatu at depths of 235–251 m and three Paratypes from the same area. Additional specimens included in the original description are from the Philippines and New Caledonia at depths of 92–120 m.

References

Discodorididae
Gastropods described in 2000